Vincent C. Cazzetta (September 24, 1925 – May 4, 2005) was an American basketball coach and head coach of the Pittsburgh Pipers during the 1967–68 season, in which they won the American Basketball Association (ABA) championship. He was also one of the most successful head coaches in Seattle University's men's basketball history

Cazzetta was head coach at Seattle from 1959 through 1963.  He ranked second in school history with a .711 winning percentage and 96 wins.  He resigned as coach with nine games left in the 1963 season after a dispute with the athletic director.

Cazzetta moved on to become an assistant coach at the University of Rhode Island.

Cazzetta became head coach of the fledgling Pittsburgh Pipers during the ABA's first season.  He made major changes to the roster throughout the season; at the end of the season the team only had four players who had been there at the start of the season.  During the season the Pipers had winning streaks of 15 and 12 games and won 18 out of 19 games at one point.  The Pipers won the 1968 ABA Championship.

Cazzetta was the ABA's Coach of the Year for the 1967–68 season.

Cazzetta resigned as coach of the Pipers after team owners refused to grant him a raise in order to help move his wife and six children, as the franchise was leaving Pittsburgh to become the Minnesota Pipers.  (The owners' refusal and move were both mistakes; the team returned to Pittsburgh as the Pipers after only one season in Minnesota.)  Cazzetta was replaced as the Pipers' head coach by Jim Harding of LaSalle College.

Cazzetta died in 2005 in Hartford, Connecticut at the age of 79.

Head coaching record

References

External links
 Basketball Reference.com page on Vince Cazzetta
 

1925 births
2005 deaths
American men's basketball coaches
Basketball coaches from Connecticut

Pittsburgh Pipers coaches
Rhode Island Rams men's basketball coaches
Seattle Redhawks men's basketball coaches
Sportspeople from New Britain, Connecticut
University of Bridgeport alumni